The University Hospital of North Norway or UNN is a hospital and health trust.

UNN is a university hospital for the region  which includes the counties of Nordland, Troms and Finnmark. It is part of the Northern Norway Regional Health Authority (Norwegian: Helse Nord). Its service area has  a combined population of 465,000. Patient treatment and diagnostic investigation as well as  training and research takes place at eleven clinics. The hospital system provides local hospital services to the 110,000 inhabitants of the Tromsø area, as well as the inhabitants of southern Troms  and northern Nordland from facilities located in Harstad,  Longyearbyen and Narvik.

UNN also serves the regional Emergency Medical Communication Center (Akuttmedisinsk kommunikasjonssentral) and operates a number of ambulance stations in Nordland and Troms.

References

External links
UNN website 
Helse Nord website

Buildings and structures in Tromsø
Hospitals in Norway
Health trusts of Norway
Hospitals with year of establishment missing
2002 establishments in Norway
Organisations based in Tromsø